Strouden Park is an area of Bournemouth, Dorset, England.

History 

On 17 April 2021, the local post office and convenience store was destroyed in a fire.

Geography 
Strouden Park is north of Queen's Park, west of Townsend and east of Redhill.

Areas 

Woodbury is an area of Strouden Park. Woodbury Roundabout is a major intersection of the A3060 road.

Facilities 

Strouden Park is served by a National Health Service surgery and the Castlepoint Shopping Centre.

Bournemouth North Cemetery and Bournemouth Crematorium is off Strouden Avenue.

Politics 
Strouden Park is part of the Muscliff and Strouden Park ward for elections to Bournemouth, Christchurch and Poole Council which elect three councillors.

Strouden Park is part of the Bournemouth East parliamentary constituency, for elections to the House of Commons of the United Kingdom.

References 

Areas of Bournemouth